Hrvatski nogometni klub Šibenik,  better known as HNK Šibenik or simply Šibenik, is a Croatian professional football club based in Šibenik. It competes in the Croatian Football League, and plays their home matches at the Stadion Šubićevac, which has a capacity of 3,412.

History 

The club was formed in 1932 under the name Radničko sportsko društvo Šibenik (Workers' Sport Association Šibenik). The first president, Dr Martin Čičin-Šain, was only appointed to this role during the first board meeting, which was held in August 1933. They played in a stadium in the town area of Crnica, next to the La Dalmatienne factory. The playing field was officially opened on 31 May 1936. The first matches played were part of a 1936 tournament between Šibenik, Osvit, Split and AŠK. Around the same time the first registered football club in Šibenik was also formed. This club was called Osvit and it was responsible for the construction of Šubićevac Stadium.

The club played its first official league match in 1946 under the name FD Šibenik and the very next year it was crowned the champion of the Dalmatia region. The club's new home ground was opened on 1 May 1948 and bore the name of "the people's hero", Rade Končar. In the 1950–51 season, Šibenik finished top of the Croatian Republic League and gained promotion to the Yugoslav Second League for the first time in its history. However, they were relegated immediately and it was not until 1954–55 that they returned to the second division. In 1957 the club made it to the semi-final of the Yugoslav Cup.

In 1983 Šibenik made it back to the Yugoslav Second League, where they played in the West Division, composed from 18 clubs from Slovenia, Croatia, Bosnia and Herzegovina and SAP Vojvodina. In their first season (1983–84) they finished fourth, while in the 1984–85 season they came close second, only three points behind the champion Čelik Zenica, thus falling short of winning promotion to the Yugoslav First League. This was their best result in the Yugoslav Second League ever. After holding the middle position of the table for the next couple of seasons, Šibenik finished fifth in the 1987–88 season. They defended their fifth place in the 1988–89 season, the first Yugoslav Second League season which featured a unified format instead of two divisions (West and East), as well as in the 1989–90 season.

Šibenik played in the Croatian First League for twelve consecutive seasons, from 1992 until 2003. In 2006 the club finished first in the Croatian Second League's southern division and returned to the first league. In the 2009–10 season, Šibenik finished fourth in domestic league, which was their best result ever, and thus qualified for the 2010–11 UEFA Europa League first qualifying round for the first time in its history. They were eliminated in the second qualifying round by Anorthosis Famagusta 2–3 on aggregate.

In the 2011–12 season, the club finished fourteenth and were relegated to the second league. In the following season, Šibenik finished fourth but due to financial difficulties, they were once again relegated to the third league. In the 2013–14 season, Šibenik finished in second place with their marksman Miro Slavica scoring 30 goals to take out the league's top goalscorer award, but failed to lead his side to promotion.

At the end of the 2014–15 season, Šibenik gained promotion to the second league, topping the third league – south. Mirko Labrović took over as manager in 2015. They finished close second to Cibalia in the 2015–16 season, failing to beat them in the last match of the season and thus failing to win direct promotion to the first tier by only one point. Šibenik played against Istra 1961 in the relegation play-offs on 29 May and 1 June 2016. Both matches ended 1–1 and Šibenik lost the play-off after penalty shootout.

In the 2018–19 season, Šibenik finished a close second to Varaždin, and again played relegation play-offs over Istra 1961. The first match played in Šibenik ended 1–1 but in the second match played on Stadion Aldo Drosina, Istra beat them by a scoreline of 0–2. On 6 May 2020, by a decision of the Croatian Football Federation to suspend the 2019–20 Croatian Second League season, Šibenik was promoted to the first tier after eight seasons.

Honours 
Yugoslav Third League (South):
Winners (3): 1950–51, 1975–76, 1982–83
Croatian First Football League:
Fourth place (2): 2006–07, 2009–10
Croatian Second Football League: 
Winners (2): 2005–06, 2019–20
Runners-up (2): 2015–16, 2018–19
Croatian Cup:
Runners-up (1): 2009–10

Recent seasons 

Key
 League: P = Matches played; W = Matches won; D = Matches drawn; L = Matches lost; F = Goals for; A = Goals against; Pts = Points won; Pos = Final position;
 Cup: R1 = First round; R2 = Round of 16; QF = Quarter-final; SF = Semi-final; RU = Runner-up; W = Competition won;

European record

Summary 

Last updated on 10 September 2010.Pld = Matches played; W = Matches won; D = Matches drawn; L = Matches lost; GF = Goals for; GA = Goals against

By season

Players

Current squad

Out on loan

Personnel

Coaching staff 

 

 

|}

Notable players 
The following HNK Šibenik players have been capped at full international level. Years in brackets indicate their spells at the club.

Coaching history 

 Tomislav Ivić (1972–1973)
 Mladen Vranković (1989–1990)
 Ivica Šangulin (1989–1992)
 Nikica Cukrov (1992)
 Franjo Džidić (1992–1993)
 Krasnodar Rora (1993)
 Branko Tucak (1993–1994)
 Ivica Matković (1993–1994)
 Ivica Šangulin (1994–1995)
 Rajko Magić (1995)
 Željko Maretić (1995–1996)
 Vinko Begović (1996–1997)
 Željko Maretić (1997–1998)
 Ivan Buljan (1998)
 Stipe Kedžo (1998)
 Rajko Magić (1998–1999)
 Stanko Mršić (1999)
 Anđelko Godinić (1999)
 Goran Krešimir Vidov (1999)
 Željko Maretić (1999–2000)
 Vjekoslav Lokica (2000)
 Milo Nižetić (2000–2001)
 Vjekoslav Lokica (2001–2002)
 Franko Bogdan (2002)
 Stanko Mršić (2002–2003)
 Luka Bonačić (2003)
 Franko Bogdan (2003–2004)
 Milan Petrović (2004)
 Petar Bakotić (2004–2005)
 Ivan Pudar (2005–2007)
 Anel Karabeg (2007)
 Ivica Kalinić (2007–2009)
 Anđelko Godinić (interim) (2009)
 Branko Karačić (2009–2010)
 Anđelko Godinić (interim) (2010)
 Vjekoslav Lokica (2010–2011)
 Goran Tomić (2011–2013)
 Ivo Šupe (2013)
 Damir Petravić (2013)
 Ivan Bulat (interim) (2013)
 Nikica Cukrov (2013–2014)
 Damir Petravić (2014)
 Mirko Labrović (2014–2016)
 Krešimir Sunara (2016)
 Goran Tomić (2016)
 Ivan Katalinić (2016)
 Anđelko Godinić (2016)
 Stipe Balajić (2016–2017)
 Zoran Slavica (2017)
 Borimir Perković (2017–2019)
 Krunoslav Rendulić (2019–2021)
 Sergi Escobar (2021) 
 Mario Rosas (2021–2022) 
 Ferdo Milin (2022)
 Marko Kartelo (interim) (2022) 
 Marko Kartelo (2022)
 Ivica Matas (interim) (2022) 
 Dean Računica (2022)
 Damir Čanadi (2022)
 Mario Cvitanović (2022–2023)  
 Damir Čanadi (2023–present)

References

External links 

 
HNK Šibenik profile at UEFA.com
HNK Šibenik profile at Sportnet.hr 
HNK Šibenik profile at Nogometni magazin 

 
Association football clubs established in 1932
Football clubs in Croatia
Football clubs in Šibenik-Knin County
Football clubs in Yugoslavia
Sport in Šibenik
1932 establishments in Croatia